Black Voice News is the first Black American online news publication on the West Coast of the United States. Founded in 1972 as a print newspaper, it was still active (as of 2020) and had moved to online publication.

History 

 1972 – The Black Voice News is started by students at University of California, Riverside
 1980 – The paper is purchased by Hardy Brown and Cheryl Brown and Brown Publishing Company is formed.
 1999 – September 20, http://www.blackvoicenews.com is registered and the online publication is launched. 
 2013 – Dr. Paulette Brown-Hinds takes over as Publisher
 2015 – BVN 2.0 is launched as http://www.blackvoicenews.com expands its presence across California

References

Further reading
 "Oppositional Discourses and Democracies", (ed. Michael Huspek), Routledge (2009), p. 220,   (analysis)

External links
 Official website

Student newspapers published in California